"I Can't Tell the Bottom from the Top" is a song by rock group the Hollies, released in April 1970 as a single. It peaked at number 7 on the UK Singles Chart.

Recording and reception 
"I Can't Tell the Bottom from the Top" was recorded at Abbey Road Studios, from 9 to 13 March 1970. Elton John, who was working as a session musician at that time, played piano on the song.

Reviewing for Melody Maker, Chris Welch wrote that "the Hollies drone on with implacable solemnity and it's nice to hear their individual vocal harmonies again and Bobby Elliot's drumming. In Cash Box, it was described as a "slowly building ballad with more of the drama of “Reflections of My Life” than the Hollies' “He Ain't Heavy,” this new side from the team features the same kind of emotional impact that guarantees satisfaction for old and new-found Hollies followers".

Charts

References 

1970 singles
1970 songs
The Hollies songs
Parlophone singles
Epic Records singles